Yasak Elma (English title: Forbidden Apple) is a Turkish television series created by Medyapım, starring Şevval Sam and Eda Ece and others. It was written by Melis Civelek and Zeynep Gür, and directed by Neslihan Yeşilyurt for three seasons, by Murat Öztürk in the fourth season and by Ece Erdek Koçoğlu from the fifth and sixth seasons.

Plot

Season 1

Ender, a woman from the high society and wife of successful businessman Halit Argun, hires Yildiz Yilmaz as her husband's personal waitress. The latter is asked to seduce Halit so Ender can get finances after their divorce but Yildiz betrays Ender and exposes her plan. Halit divorces Ender upon learning the truth. She is left without money and begins her struggle to maintain her past position in society. Meanwhile, Yildiz and Halit get married.

Yildiz's sister Zeynep falls for her boss, Alihan Tasdemir.

Season 2
Ender's and Yildiz's enmity and intrigue continue. Yildiz's first husband, Kemal, now well off, returns with a plan to take revenge on Yildiz because she divorced him on the wedding day as she had been accepted for an acting opportunity and Kemal was poor, so she left him for fame and money. Later, Kemal and Yildiz fall for each other and Kemal asks Yildiz to choose between him and Halit. Yildiz finds it difficult to leave the life she has because of Halit. Kemal marries Zehra Argun, Yildiz's stepdaughter and Halit's daughter from his first wife, which disappoints Yildiz. Later, she successfully sends him away.

Ender's first love Kaya comes and his sister, Sahika joins too. Halit is impressed by Sahika and falls for her. Yildiz is pregnant at that time. Halit kicks her out of the house and she starts living in a village.

Ender and Kaya's son Yigit, of whom Ender and Kaya are both unaware because Kaya never knew of Ender's pregnancy and Ender had given him for adoption when he was born, starts working for Sahika. He pushes Ender into the sea.

Zeynep and Alihan get married and leave for America.

Season 3

Ender and Yildiz become friends against Sahika. Yildiz names her son Halitcan and divorces Halit. Yildiz falls for Kerim but they dont end up together. Yildiz experiments with new career options, doing a weather show on tv and starts a project of producing apple puree. It turns out Sahika is working for Nadir who is Halit's enemy and he also becomes a partner in the company. Sahika later kills him by poisoning.Ender marries Kaya they also have 23 years old son.

Season 4
Kaya divorced Ender. Halit marries Ender again. Halit dies as a result of Ender and Sahika protecting Yildiz from him. Yildiz marries Cagatay, whose father HasanAli becomes a partner in the company. HasanAli kicks Ender and Sahika out of the company and they become poor. During this time they help each other. Later, they join the company back, Sahika marries HasanAli and later is killed by Cansu, a spy hired by Ender and Sahika. The season ends with a bomb blast in HasanAli's house where he is present along with Ender and Yildiz.

Season 5
Cagatay cheats on Yildiz with Kumru, a model and their neighbor. Yildiz is disheartened after she learns of this. She starts making her own shampoo and wins an award for it. At the ceremony she publicly disgraces Cagatay and Kumru. She divorces Cagatay and marries Doğan, Kumru's father, this is a paper marriage to teach a lesson to Kumru and Cagatay. Kumru leaves Cagatay on the wedding day when she learns he is with her to take revenge on Dogan. Handan, Dogan's ex wife returns and manages to win her daughter Kumrus heart and becomes a partner in the company. Later, Cagatay teams up with Ekin, Kumrus husband and Dogan's enemy's son, against Dogan. The season ends with a car accident planned by Dogan to kill Cagatay in which Cagatay dies.

Season 6
Yıldız, upon learning Doğan's involvement in the car accident, complained against him and he was sent to prison. The season starts with a 2 year time lapse. Doğan and Yıldız's daughter Yıldızsu is born while Doğan is still in prison. Later, he is freed and him and Ender team up against Yıldız.
Zeyneps comeback is a shock for Yıldız and Asuman. Later she marries Engin (Handans brother).Kumru starts a secret relashionship with saleem telling him that she is poor.

Cast

Main

Supporting

Departed characters

Broadcast schedule

International Broadcast

References

External links 
  

2018 Turkish television series debuts
Turkish drama television series
Turkish romance television series
Fox (Turkish TV channel) original programming
Television series by Med Yapım
Television shows set in Istanbul
Turkish-language television shows
Television series produced in Istanbul
Current Turkish television series